Jonathan Erlich and Colin Fleming were the defending champions, but chose not to participate together. Erlich played alongside Santiago González, but lost in the quarterfinals to Mate Pavić and Michael Venus. Fleming teamed up with Scott Lipsky, but lost in the first round to Mikhail Kukushkin and Stéphane Robert.

Fabio Fognini and Robert Lindstedt won the title, defeating Oliver Marach and Fabrice Martin in the final, 7–6(7–4), 6–3.

Seeds

Draw

Draw

References
 Main Draw

ATP Shenzhen Open - Doubles
2016 Doubles
2016 in Chinese tennis